Crider is an unincorporated community in Caldwell County, Kentucky, United States.

The community was named Crider in the 1830s, after the Crider clan of early settlers, originally from Virginia.

References

Unincorporated communities in Caldwell County, Kentucky
Unincorporated communities in Kentucky